Club Sportiv Municipal Dacia Orăștie 2010, commonly known as Dacia Orăștie, is a Romanian football club based in Orăștie, Hunedoara County and currently playing in the Liga IV – Hunedoara County, the fourth tier of the Romanian football league system. Dacia Orăștie played seven seasons in Second Division and fifteen seasons in Third Division.

History
The club was founded in 1935 under the name of Energia Orăștie by the workers of the city's chemical factory and played in the Hunedoara Regional Championships. Renamed as Flacăra Orăștie, the club promoted in Divizia C winning the 1955 Hunedoara Regional Championship.

In the 1956 season of the Third Division, Flacăra finished 5th in Series IV, but in the following season, 1957–58, finished 13th and relegated to the Fourth Division.

Followed a period of fifteen years in which he has been active in the regional and county leagues, during which period the club was renamed as Dacia Orăștie.

In the 1971–72 season, Dacia won the Hunedoara County Championship after winning the Valea Mureșului Series and defeating Parângul Lonea, the winner of Valea Jiului Series, in the championship final (2–2 on aggregate and 4–3 on penalties) qualifying for promotion play-off in Divizia C, but missed the promotion in front of CIL Blaj (0–5 at Blaj and 2–0 at Orăștie), the winner of Alba County Championship.

Dacia promoted in the following season after won again the Valea Mureșului Series and the final of the Hunedoara County Championship played against the winner of the Valea Jiului Series, Minerul Vulcan (0–0 at Petroșani and 5–0 at Simeria). The team led by Remus Prodan was composed of following players: P.Catană - I.Andea, Adrian Crișan, Sergiu Albu, Anghel, C.Răsădeanu, Verejan, Iulian Bolovan, Teodor Hopîrteanu, A.Matache, A.Dimeni, Duțu among others.

Returned to Third Division, the white and blues, with Teodor Pop as head coach, finished the 1973–74 season as runners-up in Series VIII two points behind Minerul Moldova Nouă. Also, Dacia qualified to the Round of 32 of Cupa României losing 0–5 in front of First Division team Sportul Studențesc.  Dan Vasilcin, Tiberiu Haidu, I.Andea, C.Nenu, Sergiu Albu, Adrian Crișan, Avram Sava, Ghenu, Iordan Pînteceanu, Teodor Hopîrteanu, Iosif Sereș, Marin Faur, Haidău, Iulian Bolovan, Gelu Dărăban, A. Matache, Grigore Macavei, Ion Macavei, Duțu, C.Răsădeanu, Vasile Radu and A.Dimeni.

In the 1974–75 season, Dacia Orăștie, led by Benone Popa, achieved the promotion to the Second Division winning the Serie XI of Divizia C with a difference of three points from the 2nd place, occupied by Olimpia Oradea and 15 points from the 3rd position, occupied by Voința Oradea. The Dacia squad that achieved promotion was composed of: Dan Vasilcin, Tiberiu Haidu, Nicolae Fogoroși, Sergiu Albu, Adrian Crișan, Constantin Puiu, Gelu Dărăban, Avram Sava, Iosif Sereș, Iordan Pînteceanu, Teodor Hopîrteanu, Gheorghe Costea, Nicolae Davidescu, Viorel Puie, Iulian Bolovan, Grigore Macavei, Ion Macavei, Nicolae Stanciu, Vasile Radu, Marin Faur, Ionel Stanca, Augustin Pălincaș and Viorel Daria.

Dacia Orăștie played seven consecutive seasons in Divizia B ranking as follows: 11th (1975–76), 14th  (1976–77), 14th (1977–78), 13th (1978–79), 14th (1979–80), 14th (1980–81) and 15th (1981–82) relegated to Divizia C.

In 2016, after one year of inactivity, the club was enrolled in Liga V – Hunedoara County, the fifth tier, promoted to Liga IV after was ranked first at the end of the 2016–17 season.

Honours
Liga III
Winners (1): 1974–75
Runners-up (2): 1973–74, 1989–90

Liga IV – Hunedoara County
Winners (7): 1971–72, 1972–73, 1988–89, 1991–92, 1995–96, 2005–06, 2007–08

Liga V – Hunedoara County
Winners (1): 2016–17

Hunedoara Regional Championship
Winners (1): 1955

Other performances 
Best finish in Liga II: 11th (1975–76)

References

Football clubs in Hunedoara County
Association football clubs established in 1935
Liga II clubs
Liga III clubs
Liga IV clubs
1935 establishments in Romania
Orăștie